Jules Arsène Arnaud Claretie (3 December 1840 – 23 December 1913) was a French literary figure and director of the Théâtre Français.

Biography
He was born at Limoges. After studying at the lycée Bonaparte in Paris, he became a journalist, achieving great success as dramatic critic to Le Figaro and to the Opinion nationale. He was a newspaper correspondent during the Franco-Prussian War, and during the Paris Commune acted as staff-officer in the National Guard. In 1885 he became director of the Théâtre Français, and from that time devoted his time chiefly to its administration until his death. During the battle for Octave Mirbeau's comedy Les affaires sont les affaires (Business is business), the Comité de Lecture was abolished, in October 1901, and Jules Claretie obtained sole responsibility for choosing the modern plays to be performed.

He was elected a member of the Académie française in 1888, and took his seat in February 1889, being received by Ernest Renan.

Works
The long list of his works includes:
Histoire de la révolution de 1870-1871 (5 vols., 1875-1876)
Cinq ans après: l'Alsace et la Lorraine depuis l'annexion (1876)
some annual volumes of reprints of his articles in the weekly press, entitled La Vie à Paris; La Vie moderne au théâtre (1868-1869)
Molière, sa vie et son œuvre (1871)
Les Prussiens chez eux (1875)
Histoire de la littérature française (2nd ed. 1905)
Candidat (1887), a novel of contemporary life
Brichanteau, comédien français (1896)

Several plays, some of which are based on novels of his own:
Les muscadins (1874)
Le régiment de Champagne (1877)
Les Mirabeau (1879)
Monsieur le ministre (1883), and others

Claretie also wrote three operas for the music of Jules Massenet; La Navarraise (1894), based on his novel La cigarette and written with Henri Cain, Thérèse (1907), and Amadis (1922), a work begun by Massenet in 1895, but shelved and finished in the last years of his life and premiered posthumously.

Works in English translation
 (1876). Camille Desmoulins and His Wife. 
 (1882). Monsieur le Ministre: A Romance in Real Life.
 (1896). The Crime of the Boulevard.
 (1897). Brichanteau: Actor. 
 (1899). Vicomte de Puyjoli: A Romance of the French Revolution.
 (1905). Prince Zilah.
 (1911). Which Is My Husband? 
 (2013). Obsession [L'Obsession (Moi et l'Autre), 1908] translated by Brian Stableford, Black Coat Press,

See also 
 A Clinical Lesson at the Salpêtrière

References

External links

 
 
 

1840 births
1913 deaths
19th-century French dramatists and playwrights
19th-century French journalists
19th-century French male writers
19th-century French novelists
20th-century French male writers
20th-century French novelists
Administrators of the Comédie-Française
French male journalists
French male novelists
French opera librettists
French people of the Franco-Prussian War
French theatre critics
French theatre managers and producers
Members of the Académie Française
People from Limoges